Hrishikesha (IAST: Hṛṣīkēśa)  is an epithet of the Hindu preserver deity Vishnu. It is the 47th name in the Vishnu Sahasranama. According to Adi Shankara's commentary on the Vishnu Sahasranama, the name has several meanings:
 The lord of the senses.
 He under whose control the senses subsist.
 He whose hair consists of the rays of the sun and the moon, which gives joy to the world.

Rishikesh is a city in Uttarakhand state of India named after Hrishikesha.

References

Titles and names of Krishna